The Speaker of the Karnataka Legislative Assembly is the presiding officer of the Legislative Assembly of Karnataka, the main law-making body for the Indian state of Karnataka. He is elected by the members of the Karnataka Legislative Assembly (until 1973, the Mysore Legislative Assembly). The speaker is usually a member of the Legislative Assembly.

List of Speakers
Mysore was renamed to Karnataka on 1 November 1973.

List of Deputy Speakers

See also
 Chief Ministers of Karnataka
 Karnataka Legislature

References

External links
 Speaker's list on onlinebangalore.com

Lists of people from Karnataka
Speakers
Karnataka
Lists of legislative speakers in India
Karnataka politics-related lists